Peploglyptus is a genus of clown beetles in the family Histeridae. There are at least three described species in Peploglyptus.

Species
These three species belong to the genus Peploglyptus:
 Peploglyptus belfragei J. L. LeConte, 1880
 Peploglyptus golbachi Kanaar, 1981
 Peploglyptus mulu Caterino, 2005

References

Further reading

 
 

Histeridae
Articles created by Qbugbot